Yury Patrikeyev (born 28 September 1979) is an Armenian-Russian Greco-Roman wrestler. He is an Olympic and World Championships medalist and four-time European Champion. Patrikeyev has been awarded the Master of Sport of Russia, International Class title.

Early life
Yury Patrikeyev started Greco-Roman wrestling in his hometown of Kirovo-Chepetsk under the direction of Paul Vertunova. In 1996, he enrolled in the Kuban State University of Physical Education and moved to Krasnodar, where he began wrestling under the direction of the honored coach of Russia, Igor Ivanov. Patrikeyev became a World Champion as a cadet in 1995 and a World Champion as a junior in 1999.

Career
Patrikeyev became a member of the Russian national Greco-Roman wrestling team in 2000. Two years later, he won a gold medal at the 2002 European Wrestling Championships and a bronze medal at the 2002 World Wrestling Championships.

Patrikeyev won a gold medal at the 2004 European Wrestling Championships. Despite becoming European Champion, Patrikeyev lost in the finals of the Russian Championships against Khasan Baroyev later that year and was not included in the Russian national wrestling team at the 2004 Summer Olympics in Athens. Patrikeyev considered the decision of the coaching staff unfair because Baroyev had long been exempted from participation in international competitions and had the opportunity to conduct targeted training for the Championship of Russia. In connection with this, Patrikeyev had a conflict with the head coach of the Russian national team in Greco-Roman wrestling, Gennady Sapunov, and in 2005, he made the decision to change his Russian citizenship to Armenian. At the same time, Yury continued to live and train in Krasnodar, but later served under the flag of Armenia. He officially left the Russian national team in 2005.

Now a wrestler of Armenia, Patrikeyev won a bronze medal at the 2007 World Wrestling Championships. The following year he won his third gold medal at the 2008 European Wrestling Championships. Patrikeyev competed at the 2008 Summer Olympics in Beijing. He won an Olympic bronze medal. Patrikeyev became the first Olympian to win an Olympic medal for Armenia that wasn't born in Armenia.

Patrikeyev was a member of the Armenian Greco-Roman wrestling team at the 2009 Wrestling World Cup. The Armenian team came in third place. Patrikeyev personally won a silver medal. Patrikeyev became a fourth-time the European Champion at the 2009 European Wrestling Championships, winning yet another gold medal. Patrikeyev returned to his native Russia for the 2010 World Wrestling Championships in Moscow. He won a silver medal at the competition.

Patrikeyev was a member of the Armenian Greco-Roman wrestling team at the 2010 Wrestling World Cup. The Armenian team came in third place. Patrikeyev personally won a gold medal.

Patrikeyev won bronze medals at both the 2011 European Wrestling Championships and 2012 European Wrestling Championships. Patrikeyev qualified for the 2012 Summer Olympics in London by coming in first place at the European Qualification Tournament. In the first round, Patrikeyev defeated Baroyev, but in the next round lost to Bashir Babajanzadeh and was unable to win a medal. He came in eighth place.

Personal life
Patrikeyev has a wife and daughter. He has stated that he considers himself an Armenian as much as a Russian.

References

External links
 

1979 births
Living people
Armenian male sport wrestlers
Russian male sport wrestlers
Olympic wrestlers of Armenia
Wrestlers at the 2008 Summer Olympics
Wrestlers at the 2012 Summer Olympics
Olympic bronze medalists for Armenia
Olympic medalists in wrestling
Medalists at the 2008 Summer Olympics
World Wrestling Championships medalists
European Wrestling Championships medalists